St Barnabas' Church, Bradwell is a Grade II listed
parish church in the Church of England in Bradwell, Derbyshire.

History

The church was designed by the architect C C Townsend. Construction started in 1867 and the building was consecrated on 22 October 1868 by Bishop Trower.  Samuel Fox, inventor of the Paragon umbrella frame, donated £100 towards the cost of constructing the church. The foundation for the tower was laid on Saturday 3 August 1888 and the contract awarded to Alfred Hill of Tideswell. The design of the tower was by Naylor and Tait of Derby. The tower and clock were completed and opened on 15 July 1889. The spire was completed in 1891.

Parish status

The church is in a joint parish with
St Edmund’s Church, Castleton
St Peter's Church, Hope

Organ

The church contains a pipe organ by Brindley and Foster. A specification of the organ can be found on the National Pipe Organ Register.

See also
Listed buildings in Bradwell, Derbyshire

References

Church of England church buildings in Derbyshire
Grade II listed churches in Derbyshire
Churches completed in 1869
1869 establishments in England